South Omaha is a former city and current district of Omaha, Nebraska, United States. During its initial development phase the town's nickname was "The Magic City" because of the seemingly overnight growth, due to the rapid development of the Union Stockyards. Annexed by the City of Omaha in 1915, the community has numerous historical landmarks many are within the South Omaha Main Street Historic District.

Definition 

The traditional borders of South Omaha included Vinton Street to the north, Harrison Street to the south, the Missouri River to the east, and 42nd Street to the west.

History 
The area that would become South Omaha was rural until the early 1880s, when cattle baron Alexander Hamilton Swan decided to establish a stockyards operation just south of Omaha. The South Omaha plat was registered on July 18, 1884. Two years later, South Omaha was incorporated as a city.  By 1890, the city had grown to 8,000 people, a rate of growth that earned it the nickname of "The Magic City".

In less than 10 years, South Omaha had developed as a regional stockyards and meatpacking center. As its industrial jobs did not require high-level language skills, it drew thousands of immigrant workers, mostly from eastern and southern Europe. This area of the city showed ethnic succession, as different waves of immigrants established certain territories as their own during their first settlement. Some descendants moved out of the area into other parts of the city, and newer immigrant groups filled the neighborhoods behind them.

South Omaha was annexed by Omaha on June 20, 1915. At that time it was 6.4 mi² and had 40,000 residents. In 1947, there were 15,000 people working in meatpacking. Structural changes to the meatpacking industry in the 1960s, including decentralization of operations, cost the city 10,000 jobs.

Cultural diversity 

South Omaha was, and continues to be, culturally diverse. Many residents are descended from the Czech, Irish, Italian, Latino, Lithuanian, and Polish immigrants who made up the original workforce in the meatpacking industry; they were primarily Roman Catholic in religion. In recent decades, South Omaha has seen an influx of new immigrants representing Hispanic and Sudanese populations.

Places of worship
The early diversity is evident in the variety of religious institutions established by the various ethnic communities, which established national Roman Catholic and other places of worship, including

Catholic Churches:
Irish – St. Mary's, St. Bridget's and St. Patrick's
German – St. Rose and St. Joseph
Czech – Assumption and St. Adalbert's
Polish – St. Stanislaus, Immaculate Conception Church and St. Francis of Assisi
Lithuanian – St. Anthony's
Italian – St. Francis Cabrini and St. Ann's
Croatian – Sts. Peter and Paul
Hispanic – Our Lady of Guadalupe

Orthodox churches:
Greeks – St. John's Greek Orthodox
Serbian – St. Nicholas
Romanian – Holy Cross

In the late 19th century, a Jewish synagogue was established in South Omaha.

Periodicals
In addition to the churches, in the early part of the 20th century, the Lithuanian community published a newspaper, known as the Bell of the West.

Landmarks in South Omaha

Notable people
 Dale Carnegie, the future motivational speaker and writer, had his first job out of college here, working for Armour & Company as their South Omaha sales representative.
 Johnny Goodman, golfer, winner of U.S. Amateur and U.S. Open; born in South Omaha

See also
 South Omaha (category)
Greek Town riot

References

External links

History of South Omaha on NEGenWeb

 
Neighborhoods in Omaha, Nebraska
1880s establishments in Nebraska
1915 disestablishments in Nebraska